Schtschurowskia is a genus of flowering plants belonging to the family Apiaceae.

Its native range is Central Asia and is found in Kazakhstan, Kyrgyzstan, Tajikistan and Uzbekistan.

The genus name of Schtschurowskia is in honour of Gregory Ephimovich Shchurovsky (1803–1884), a Russian Professor of geology in Moscow. 
It was first described and published in Izv. Imp. Obshch. Lyubit. Estestv. Moskovsk. Univ. Vol.34 (Issue 2) on page 40 in 1882.

Known species
According to Kew:
Schtschurowskia margaritae 
Schtschurowskia meifolia

References

Apioideae
Flora of Central Asia
Apioideae genera